Đức Thắng may refer to several places in Vietnam, including:

Đức Thắng, Hanoi, a ward of Bắc Từ Liêm District
Đức Thắng, Bình Thuận, a ward of Phan Thiết
Đức Thắng, Bắc Giang, a commune of Hiệp Hòa District
Đức Thắng, Quảng Ngãi, a commune of Mộ Đức District
Đức Thắng, Hưng Yên, a commune of Tiên Lữ District